Gimme Some Neck is the third solo album by English musician Ronnie Wood, released in 1979. It was a minor hit and his best performance on the US charts to date, peaking at number 45 on Billboard during a 13-week chart run. The album artwork features illustrations drawn by Wood, with a self-portrait in the centre of the front side.

To tour the United States in support of the album, Wood formed the New Barbarians with musicians including Keith Richards, Ian McLagan and Bobby Keys, all of whom contributed to the recording. The Landover concert from this tour was recorded and released as Buried Alive: Live in Maryland in 2006.

Track listing
All tracks composed by Ronnie Wood; except where noted.
Side one
 "Worry No More" (Jerry Lynn Williams) – 2:34 
 "Breakin' My Heart" – 4:17
 "Delia" (Traditional) – 0:42
 "Buried Alive" – 3:37
 "Come to Realise" – 3:52
 "Infekshun" – 4:03
Side two
 "Seven Days" (Bob Dylan) – 4:10
 "We All Get Old" – 4:09
 "F.U.C. Her" – 3:15
 "Lost and Lonely" – 4:14
 "Don't Worry" – 3:26

Personnel
 Ronnie Wood – lead vocals, guitar, pedal steel, Dobro, bass
 Keith Richards – guitar, backing vocals
 Dave Mason – guitar
 Robert Popwell – bass
 Charlie Watts – drums
 Mick Fleetwood – drums on "Seven Days"
 Jim Keltner – percussion
 Ian McLagan – keyboards
 Harry Phillips – piano
 Jerry Lynn Williams – piano and backing vocals on "Worry No More"
 Mick Jagger – backing vocals
 Jon Lind – backing vocals
 Bobby Keys – tenor saxophone on "Don't Worry"

Technical
Geoff Workman – engineer
Tony Lane – design
Ronnie Wood – paintings

Charts

Studio and road crew
 Royden "Chuch" Magee
 Gary Schultz
 Ernest Cain Salgado
 Johnny Starbuck

References

Ronnie Wood albums
1979 albums
Albums produced by Roy Thomas Baker
Columbia Records albums